The province of Ontario has 24 publicly funded colleges, known as Colleges of Applied Arts and Technology (CAATs). In 2003, three CAATs (Conestoga, Humber, and Sheridan) were designated as Institutes of Technology and Advanced Learning.

Most Ontario colleges were founded between 1965 and 1967, after the passage of Minister of Education Bill Davis' Bill-153 on May 21, 1965, to create a post-secondary educational system different from that of universities. The Ontario Colleges of Applied Arts and Technology Act, 2002, indicates that the purpose of Ontario public colleges is to offer "career-oriented, post-secondary education and training to assist individuals in finding and keeping employment, to meet the needs of employers and the changing work environment and to support the economic and social development of their local and diverse communities."

In 2000, the Ministry of Advanced Education and Skills Development authorized colleges to offer a limited number of applied baccalaureate degrees under the Postsecondary Education Choice and Excellence Act, 2000. In 2012–2013 approximately 74 degree programs were offered by 12 Ontario colleges.

List of public colleges
Note: Colleges marked with (FR) are French-speaking institutions.

Military colleges 
Ontario has 1 military college, the Royal Military College of Canada (commonly abbreviated in English as RMC), in Kingston, ON.

Private colleges
Ontario has over 500 private career colleges. These colleges are regulated by the Private Career Colleges Act, 2005, (S.O. 2005, c. 28, Schedule L). under which they must be registered and approved by the Superintendent of Private Career Colleges.

See also
List of universities in Canada
List of colleges in Canada
List of business schools in Canada
List of law schools in Canada
List of Canadian universities by endowment
Higher education in Canada
Higher education in Ontario
List of Ontario students' associations
Ontario Student Assistance Program
Ontario College Application Service
University Colleges, Ontario

References

External links
 Canadian College of Business, Science & Technology
 Academy of Learning College Kingston ON Campus
 Addresses and websites of Ontario's colleges
 Community College and CEGEP Jobs in Canada

Ontario
Colleges